The 65th Directors Guild of America Awards, honoring the outstanding directorial achievements in films, documentary and television in 2012, were presented on February 2, 2013 at the Hollywood and Highland Center. The ceremony was hosted by Kelsey Grammer for the second time. The nominees for the feature film category were announced on January 8, 2013, the nominations for the television and commercial categories were announced on January 9, 2013, and the nominees for documentary directing were announced on January 14, 2013.

Winners and nominees

Film

Television

Commercials

Lifetime Achievement in Feature Film
 Miloš Forman

Lifetime Achievement in News Direction
 Eric Shapiro

Frank Capra Achievement Award
 Susan Zwerman

Robert B. Aldrich Service Award
 Michael Apted

Franklin J. Schaffner Achievement Award
 Dency Nelson

References

External links
  

Directors Guild of America Awards
2012 film awards
2012 television awards
Direct
Direct
2013 awards in the United States
2012 guild awards